Ghailadubba  is a small town and ancient market place in Kankai Municipality near the Biring river in Jhapa District in the Province No. 1 of south-eastern Nepal. At the time of the 1991 Nepal census it had a population of 11,185.

The village was merged into Kankai Municipality in May 2014.

Main trade
 Jute
 Cattle
 Food grains

References

Populated places in Jhapa District